The St. Joseph's Cathedral  also called Callao Cathedral or Callao's Main Church is a religious building in El Callao part of the constitutional province of Callao part of the South American country of Peru. It is a property of the Catholic Church. The building is neoclassical in style. The construction was completed in 1893 with the design of Antonio Dañino. It was remodeled after an earthquake in 1970. On September 16, 1995, it was officially consecrated as Callao Cathedral.

It is the mother church or main church of the Diocese of Callao (Diocese Callaënsis) that was created in 1967 by Pope Paul VI through the bull Aptiorem Ecclesiarum.

It is under the pastoral responsibility of Bishop José Luis Del Palacio and Pérez-Medel.

See also
Roman Catholicism in Peru
St. Joseph's Cathedral

References

Roman Catholic cathedrals in Peru
Callao Region
Roman Catholic churches completed in 1893
19th-century Roman Catholic church buildings in Peru